The 2022 NASCAR Whelen Modified Tour was the thirty-eighth season of the NASCAR Whelen Modified Tour, a stock car racing tour sanctioned by NASCAR. It began with the New Smyrna Visitors Bureau 200 at New Smyrna Speedway on February 12 and ended with the Virginia is for Racing Lovers 200 at Martinsville Speedway on October 27.

Justin Bonsignore entered the season as the defending series champion. Jon McKennedy won his first championship in the series in 2022.

Schedule
On November 3, 2021, NASCAR announced the 2022 Whelen Modified Tour schedule. There are 16 scheduled races for the season which includes an inaugural stop at New Smyrna Speedway.

Results and standings

Race results

Point standings

(key) Bold – Pole position awarded by time. Italics – Pole position set by final practice results or rainout. * – Most laps led. ** – All laps led.

See also
 2022 NASCAR Cup Series
 2022 NASCAR Xfinity Series
 2022 NASCAR Camping World Truck Series
 2022 ARCA Menards Series
 2022 ARCA Menards Series East
 2022 ARCA Menards Series West
 2022 NASCAR Pinty's Series
 2022 NASCAR Mexico Series
 2022 NASCAR Whelen Euro Series
 2022 SRX Series

References

Whelen Modified Tour
Whelen Modified Tour